Christian Franzen Nissen (1864–1923) was a Danish photographer and diplomat largely active in Spain. Specialised in portrait photography and often employed by the Spanish Royal Family, he reportedly self-styled as "Photographer of Kings and King of Photographers".

Biography 
He was born in 1864. Once settled in Spain, he opened a photographic studio at the Madrid's . Very appreciated by Queen Mother Maria Christina, he was able to take many full-body portraits of the Spanish Royal Family and the aristocracy. He became consul of Denmark in 1910. He was, along with Kaulak, one of the best known portrait photographers in Spain by the turn of the 20th century. He died in 1923.

Gallery

References 

1864 births
1923 deaths
Spanish photographers
Danish photographers
Portrait photographers